The 2018–19 Inverness Caledonian Thistle F.C. season is the club's second season in the Scottish Championship, having been relegated from the Scottish Premiership at the end of the 2016–17 season. Caley Thistle will also compete in the Scottish Challenge Cup, Scottish League Cup and the Scottish Cup. This season will be the 25th season since Inverness joined the Scottish Football League. This season is also the return of the Highland derby after Ross County were relegated one season after Inverness.

Events

May 2018 

 14 May 2018: 10 Youth Team players, dubbed "Class of 2018" as a reference to Fergie's Fledglings which were dubbed "Class of '92", are called up into the first team.

June 2018 

 18 June 2018: ICT win the SFA U17 League, winning 22 of 24 and scoring 104 goals along the way.

July 2018 

 3 July 2018: The longest serving player in ICTFC history, Ross Tokely, returns to the club as the youth coach.
 7 July 2018: Carl Tremarco is made team captain after Gary Warren's exit to Yeovil Town.
 13 July 2018: Inverness install a new ticket system, which replaces the old tear stub tickets with barcoded tickets.
 22 July 2018: #biggesthomegame returns for the second consecutive year, with the game ending with a 25–25 tie, which was a massive improvement from the previous season where they were beaten by the 100 kids 20–5.

August 2018 

 8 August 2018: ICT announce that goalkeeper, Ryan Esson, will receive a testimonial match as recognition for his 10-year career with the Caley Jags.
 10 August 2018: Former player and first captain of ICTFC, Alan Hercher, dies aged 52.
 11 August 2018: A minutes silence is held for Alan Hercher ahead of Inverness' 0–0 draw with Ayr United, a minutes silence is also held at Clachnacuddin, where Alan was also a player, ahead of their 1–0 win over Lossiemouth.
12 August 2018: Inverness open investigations on some of their home support after abuse was hurled towards Liam Polworth and his family, mainly his sister at Saturday's home game.
13 August 2018: Inverness issue a Club Statement, saying "Inverness Caledonian Thistle were saddened and angered to learn of sustained verbal abuse directed at one of our players and his family by a small minority of supporters during Saturday's match with Ayr United...Individuals who were involved in this abuse have been identified, and are in the process of being banned from attending future Inverness Caledonian Thistle fixtures." It is currently unknown how long the bans are to be served, but is speculated that it is likely to be a Rest of Season ban from the ground or any ground hosting an ICT fixture.
14 August 2018: Defending champions Inverness tumble out of the Scottish Challenge Cup in a first round home fixture vs Dunfermline Athletic, which was a game that was criticized by many fans and some media after Dunfermline Athletic were awarded a penalty despite the foul taking place at least a yard outside the box.
22 August 2018: Inverness progress to the semi finals of the North of Scotland Cup, after a 6–0 win over Lossiemouth.
23 August 2018: Inverness draft in their first ever Brazilian player, youngster Machado Matheus, on a 2-year contract, from Red Bull Brasil.
23 August 2018: Club site (ictfc.com), unexpectedly goes down for host migration, with no prior warning, much to fans annoyance.

September 2018 

 11 September 2018: Former Caledonian manager, Alex Main, dies aged 86
 11 September 2018: Inverness secure their North of Scotland cup final after a 4–0 victory over the Can-cans of Forres. They will play local rivals Ross County in the 7 October final at Clachnacuddin's Grant Street Park.
15 September 2018: Inverness go top of the championship after a 3–2 win over Partick Thistle, continuing their streak of 17 league games unbeaten, which started in March of the previous season.
22 September 2018: Inverness drop to 2nd in the championship after a nil nil draw with Ross County, with County dropping to 4th place.
29 September 2018: Inverness fall further after a second consecutive 0–0 draw, however extending their unbeaten streak to 18 games.

October 2018 

 6 October 2018: Inverness retain their unbeaten streak at 19 games, after a draw with Greenock Morton at home which ended one a piece.
 7 October 2018: Inverness CT lose 3–2 to rivals Ross County in the North of Scotland Cup final at Grant Street Park.
30 October 2018: Inverness equalize their 21-year-old record of 22 games unbeaten after a 2–2 draw with Dunfermline Athletic.

November 2018 

 3 November 2018: Inverness extend their record with a 2–2 draw with Ross County.
8 November 2018: Riccardo Calder is kicked out of the club after being found guilty of assault in Birmingham after the end of the previous season.

December 2018 

 1 December 2018: Inverness's 25-game unbeaten streak comes to an abrupt halt after a 3–2 loss to Falkirk at home.
4 December 2018: Inverness thrash Edinburgh City 6–1 in the Scottish Cup Third round.

January 2019 

 28 January 2019:  Youngster Daniel MacKay is called up to the Scotland national under-19 football team. The first to receive a call up to any Scotland squad since Andrew Shinnie in 2012.

February 2019 

 1 February 2019: Tulloch gift the stadium to the club, giving the club full ownership of the plot.
 7 February 2019: Inverness take Inverness City's women's team under their wing and rebrand them as ICT WFC.
19 February 2019: Inverness progress to the Quarter-finals of the Scottish Cup after beating Ross County 5 – 4 on the first penalty shootout outside the finals since 1990.

March 2019 

 3 March 2019: Inverness progress to the semi-finals of the Scottish Cup after an injury time winner from Aaron Doran in a 2–1 victory at Tannadice Park.

April 2019 

 4 April 2019: John Robertson and Aaron Doran are named March's Scottish Championship Manager and Player of the Month respectively.
5 April 2019: Summer signing Angus Beith is forced to retire due to a long standing hip injury that has prevented him from playing. A benefit match for him is to be played between Inverness and his previous side Heart of Midlothian. 
13 April 2019: Inverness fail to beat Heart of Midlothian, and succumb to a 3–0 defeat, however, it did not go without controversy, as a would be equaliser from Jamie McCart was ruled out for offside, despite it being played back onside by ex-Inverness and Hearts Midfielder, Jake Mulraney.
20 April 2019: In a push for the Premiership play-offs, Inverness falter against Dundee United, which delay rivals, Ross County's title celebrations. By sheer luck, despite the loss, they still secured their playoff spot, as Dunfermline, who trailed by 9 points with three games to play, failed to break Queen of the South. Had both Inverness and Dunfermline won their games and the won their following game, it would come down to the final day, as Inverness would host Dunfermline in the final clash of the season. United on the other hand, have to hope Ross County lose both of their final games, and that they win both of their final games, as it boils down to a 6 point difference between the two teams, however, it would play in Ross County's favour through goal difference, as United would have to score a minimum of 18 goals to take them to a level goal difference.

Summary

Management 
John Robertson will return to the club for his second season after a close finish to the previous season, by missing out on playoffs by only two points.

Fixtures and results 
Fixtures will be announced by the SPFL in June 2018.

Friendlies 
*Note: Games played on the same day and same time are played with two different squads led by two different managers. Fixtures are being played on the same day as to avoid preseason friendlies leaking into time taken up by the League Cup Group Stage.

League 
SPFL fixtures were announced at 9:00am GMT on Friday, 15 June 2018, and are subject to change.
 

*despite losing to Dundee United, Inverness still secured play-offs, as Dunfermline failed to gain ground against Queen of the South.

Premiership play-offs

Scottish Cup 
Inverness played their Scottish Cup match on Sunday, 25 November 2018, as they are drawn into the 3rd round of the tournament against Edinburgh City.

League Cup 
Inverness were drawn into Group C of the 2018–19 Scottish League Cup on 25 May 2018, along with Heart of Midlothian, Raith Rovers, Cowdenbeath, and Cove Rangers, the first match will be played on 14 July. However, Inverness failed to make the best runners up, losing out on goal difference to Partick Thistle.

Irn Bru Challenge Cup 
Inverness were the defending champions going into this cup, with the first game being played on 14 August 2018, however were knocked out in their first game by Dunfermline.

North of Scotland Cup 
In this competition, Inverness will use a mixed team of mainly U19s and some first team/reserve players to give a fair chance to the significantly smaller teams they come up against.

Team statistics

League table

Management Statistics

First team player statistics

League Goalscorers

Overall Goalscorers 

*as of match played 11 May 2019

**players in Italics left the club during the season, so cannot move up the table

Hat-tricks

Transfers 

*At time of transfer/loan

See also 

 List of Inverness Caledonian Thistle F.C. seasons

References

Inverness Caledonian Thistle F.C. seasons
Inverness